The Disappearance of Flight 412 is a 1974 made-for-television science fiction drama film starring Glenn Ford, Bradford Dillman, David Soul and Guy Stockwell. The film was shown as an NBC World Premiere Movie in 1974.

Plot
U.S. Air Force Colonel Pete Moore (Glenn Ford) is the commander of the Whitney Air Force Base 458th Radar Test Group, which has been experiencing electrical difficulties aboard its aircraft. To find the problem, he sends a four-man crew on Flight 412, with Captain Bishop (David Soul) as commander. Lt Podryski (Greg Mullavey), Capt Riggs (Robert F. Lyons), and Lt Ferguson (Stanley Bennett Clay) are Bishop's crew. Shortly into the test, the Grumman Gulfstream II jet, a small twin-engine VIP transport, picks up three blips on radar. Subsequently, two fighters scramble to investigate and mysteriously disappear.

At this point, Flight 412 is forced to land by an unnamed top-level military intelligence group that debunks UFO sightings (referred to throughout the film by their facility's radio call sign "Digger Control", though this is never implied to be the organization's actual name), diverted to a remote, abandoned military airfield somewhere in the desert in the American Southwest.  The crew is taken to a barracks building to undergo an 18-hour debriefing by members of a military Special Investigation Division (SID) team, which is more like an indoctrination to convince them that they did not see a UFO.  Meanwhile, their aircraft is stored in a dilapidated hangar to hide it from search-and-rescue aircraft.  To all appearances, Flight 412 has simply vanished into thin air. Colonel Moore, with the help of Major Mike Dunning (Bradford Dillman), sets out to find out what has happened to his crew.

Just as the government interrogation begins to raise doubts among the flight crew about the "flying saucer" sighting, Moore and Dunning find the secret base. Their efforts to release the crew are stymied by SID leader, Colonel Trottman (Guy Stockwell), who cites national security concerns. Bishop attempts to escape, but Trottman threatens to make things rough on his crew, who agree to accept a sanitized version of their report. Moore presses Trottman for an explanation, despite warning from Dunning to drop the matter.  Dunning appears to have faced similar treatment following an incident in which he too faced SID.  After their release, when Dunning and Podryski choose to accept the report, the others: Moore, Bishop, Ferguson, and Riggs seek the help of General Enright (Kent Smith). Trottman appears and makes the case to the General that nothing untoward has happened. Speaking to Moore in private, General Enright reveals that some wreckage of the missing jets have been found, but only minimal remains.  The pilots are still missing.

Moore tries to pursue the matter, but no one cared, likely because those responsible were unwilling to deal with the implications of the incident.

Four months later, the exercise was repeated, only now with more men overseeing it.  Again mysterious objects appear, with the same results.  Following a debrief, the matter was dropped.

Those who cooperate get promoted, while the others find that their careers suffer.  Colonel Moore was denied promotion, and retired at minimum age.

Cast
As appearing in The Disappearance of Flight 412, (main roles and screen credits identified):
 Glenn Ford as Colonel Pete Moore
 Bradford Dillman as Major Mike Dunning
 David Soul as Captain Roy Bishop
 Robert F. Lyons as Captain Cliff Riggs
 Guy Stockwell as Colonel Trottman
 Greg Mullavey as Lieutenant Tony Podryski
 Kent Smith as General Enright
 Stanley Bennett Clay as 2nd Lieutenant Ferguson (credited as Stanley Clay)
 Jonathan Goldsmith as Smith (credited as Jonathan Lippe)
 Jack Ging as Green
 Ken Kercheval as White
 Edward Winter as Mr. Cheer

Production
The Disappearance of Flight 412 was shot at Oxnard Air Force Base and Edwards Air Force Base. The film starts out with stock black-and-white clips of UFOs in flight and various individuals reporting sightings in newsreel style, with narrator voice-overs, to set the mood. However, the remainder of the film (in color) deals only briefly with the fictitious UFO encounter by the aircrew, focusing instead on their ordeal as they undergo an arduous debriefing and brainwashing (perhaps better described as gaslighting) at the hands of their somewhat mysterious captors. It uses on-screen time stamp titles to lend the feeling of a documentary, similar to the 1971 film The Andromeda Strain.

Reception
After its broadcast premiere, The Disappearance of Flight 412 was destined for late-night TV and lately, home media release. Later reviews have relegated the film to an also-ran due to its "cheesy" production values with a reliance on stock footage.

References

Notes

Citations

Bibliography

 Ford, Peter. Glenn Ford: A Life (Wisconsin Film Studies). Madison, Wisconsin: University of Wisconsin Press, 2011. .
 Thomas, Nick. Raised by the Stars: Interviews with 29 Children of Hollywood Actors. Jefferson, North Carolina: McFarland, 2011. .

External links
 
 
 

1970s science fiction drama films
1974 television films
1974 films
American aviation films
Films directed by Jud Taylor
NBC network original films
UFO-related television
American science fiction drama films
1970s English-language films
1970s American films